Alexis Hocquenghem (14 January 1908 – 17 April 1990) was a French mathematician. He is known for his discovery of Bose–Chaudhuri–Hocquenghem codes, today better known under the acronym BCH codes. This class of error correcting codes was published by Hocquenghem in 1959. The code also bears the names of R. C. Bose and D. K. Ray-Chaudhuri, who independently discovered these codes and published that result shortly afterwards, in 1960.

Notes

References
 A. Hocquenghem. Codes correcteurs d'erreurs. Chiffres (Paris), 2:147–156, September 1959

1908 births
1990 deaths
20th-century French mathematicians